István Cserha is a Hungarian sprint canoeist who competed in the late 1960s and early 1970s. He won two medals in the C-2 10000 m event at the ICF Canoe Sprint World Championships with a silver in 1971 and a bronze in 1966.

References

Hungarian male canoeists
Living people
Year of birth missing (living people)
ICF Canoe Sprint World Championships medalists in Canadian